Empusa uvarovi is a species of praying mantis in the family Empusidae.

See also
List of mantis genera and species

References

uvarovi
Insects described in 1921